The SCNS Higher School, officially known as the Higher School of the State Committee for National Security is a Tajik public institution under the Government of Tajikistan. Based in Dushanbe, it trains officers for the agency, which serves to maintain national security and gather intelligence for Tajikistan.

Summary 
The status of the institute is a higher professional school and has a state license of the Ministry of Education of Tajikistan for the right to conduct educational activities in the field of higher education and a Certificate of state accreditation.

Departments 

 Department of Law

History 
During the Soviet era, the Higher School of KGB operated in the City of Dushanbe. In January 1993, a decision was made to establish the National Security Committee's Training Center. That September, training courses began for the first time. On 3 February 2000, the Higher School of the Ministry of Security was established by government order at the training center and the courses.

Heads 

 Islom Kholmurodov (2 December 2014-present)

See also 

 Border Troops Academy

References 

State Committee for National Security (Tajikistan)
Military academies of Tajikistan